Anthony de la Roché (spelled also Antoine de la Roché, Antonio de la Roché or Antonio de la Roca in some sources) was a 17th-century English merchant born in London to a French Huguenot father and an English mother. During a commercial voyage between Europe and South America he was blown off course, and visited the Antarctic island of South Georgia, making the first discovery of land south of the Antarctic Convergence.

1675 Voyage

Discovery of South Georgia
Having acquired a 350-ton ship in Hamburg and obtained permission by the Spanish authorities to trade in Spanish America, la Roché called at the Canary Islands in May 1674 and in October that year arrived in the port of Callao in the Viceroyalty of Peru by way of Le Maire Strait and Cape Horn.  On his return voyage, sailing from Chiloé Island (Chile) to Bahia de Todos os Santos (Salvador, Brazil), in April 1675 la Roché rounded Cape Horn and was overwhelmed by tempestuous conditions in the tricky waters off Staten Island (Isla de los Estados).  His ship failed to make Le Maire Strait as desired, nor round the east extremity of Staten Island (i.e. make the mythical 'Brouwer's Strait' present on the old maps since the 1643 Dutch expedition of Admiral Hendrik Brouwer), and was carried far away to the east instead.  Eventually they found refuge in one of South Georgia's southern bays – possibly Drygalski Fjord according to some experts – where the battered ship anchored for a fortnight.

According to la Roché's report published in London in 1678 and its surviving 1690 summary, "they found a Bay, in which they anchored close to a Point or Cape which stretches out to the Southeast with 28. 30. and 40. fathoms sand and rock". The surrounding glaciated, mountainous terrain was described as "some Snow Mountains near the Coast, with much bad Weather".  Once the weather cleared up, the ship set sail, and while rounding the southeast extremity of South Georgia they sighted Clerke Rocks further to the southeast.

Gough Island landing
Several days after his departure from South Georgia, la Roché came across another uninhabited island, "where they found water, wood and fish", and spent six days "without seeing any human being", thus making what some historians believe was the first landing on the South Atlantic island that had been discovered by the Portuguese navigator Gonçalo Álvares in 1505 or 1506 (and known as Gough Island since 1731).

La Roché successfully reached the Brazilian port of Salvador, and eventually arrived in La Rochelle, France on 29 September 1675.

Legacy
Soon after the voyage, cartographers started to depict on their maps Roché Island, and Straits de la Roche separating the island from an Unknown Land to the southeast, honouring the discoverer.

Captain James Cook was aware of la Roché's discovery, mentioning it in his ship journal upon approaching South Georgia in January 1775. However, Cook made the first recorded landing, and surveyed and mapped Roché Island, renaming it for King George III in the process.

The second-ever map of South Georgia, made in 1802 by Captain Isaac Pendleton of the American sealing vessel Union and reproduced by the Italian polar cartographer Arnaldo Faustini in 1906, was entitled South Georgia; Discovered by the Frenchman La Roche in the year 1675. (Pendleton erred regarding la Roché's nationality due to his French last name.)

Maps showing la Roché's discovery
In particular, the newly discovered island appeared on the following 17th–18th century maps:

 J.T. Albernaz, J. de Attayde e F. de Seixas y Lovera. Mapas generales originales y universales des todo el orue con los puertos principales y fortalezas de Ambas Indias y una descripcion topographica de la region Austral Magallonica año de 1692. Published in 1630, appended in 1692.
 L'Isle, Guillaume de; J. Covens & C. Mortier. (1700/20). L'Amerique Meridionale. Paris.
 Chatelain, Henry A. (1705/19). Nouvelle Carte de Géographie de la Partie Méridionale de l'Amérique. Amsterdam.
 L'Isle, Guillaume de & Henry A. Chatelain. (1705/19). Carte du Paraguai, du Chili, du Detroit de Magellan. Paris.
 Lens, Bernard & George Vertue. (ca. 1710). Map of South America. London.
 Price, Charles. (ca. 1713). South America corrected from the observations communicated to the Royal Society's of London and Paris. London.
 De Fer, Nicolas. (1720). Partie la plus méridionale de l'Amérique, où se trouve le Chili, le Paraguay, et les Terres Magellaniques avec les Fameux Détroits de Magellan et de Le Maire. Paris.
 Homann Heirs. (1733). Typus Geographicus Chili a Paraguay Freti Magellanici. Nuremberg.
 Moll, Herman. (1736). A map of Chili, Patagonia, La Plata and ye South Part of Brasil. London.
 L'Isle, Guillaume de & Giambattista Albrizzi. (1740). Carta Geografica della America Meridionale. Venice.
 Seale, Richard W. (ca. 1745). A Map of South America. With all the European Settlements & whatever else is remarkable from the latest & best observations. London.
 Cowley, John. (ca. 1745). A Map of South America. Londra.
 Gibson, John. (1753). South America. London.
 Buache, Philippe. (1754). Carte des Terres Australes, Comprises entre le Tropique du Capricorne et le Pôle Antarctique. Paris.
 Jefferys, Thomas. (1776). South America. Londra.
 Robert de Vaugondy, Didier. (1777). Hemisphère Australe ou Antarctique. Paris.
 Arrowsmith, Aaron. (1794). Map of the World on a Globular Projection, Exhibiting Particularly the Nautical Researches of Capn. James Cook, F.R.S. with all the Recent Discoveries to the Present Time. London.

Honours
Roché Peak, the highest feature on Bird Island, South Georgia, and Roché Glacier in Vinson Massif, Antarctica are named for Anthony de la Roché.

See also
 History of South Georgia and the South Sandwich Islands
 Gough Island
 Roché Glacier
 Roché Peak

References

English explorers
Sailors from London
Explorers of Antarctica
History of South Georgia
17th-century English people
Year of birth unknown
Year of death unknown
17th century in Antarctica